Debbie Goh (born Goh Seok Sim; 8 November 1978) is a Malaysian film and television actor. Goh is the former Miss Malaysia Chinese International 1998 and a Malaysia artiste.

Background
She stepped into the spotlight when she won the first Miss Malaysia Chinese International beauty pageant in 1999. At 19, while studying in Singapore, Goh was spotted and asked to model. She was then scouted to join the Hong Kong film production company, Golden Harvest, for a five-year contract. That was when she accepted an offer by Hong Kong pay-TV station, i-CABLE News Channel, to be a TV presenter.

She is the co-owner of the IR1968 Indonesian restaurant in Kuala Lumpur.

Awards

Golden Awards
2010: Most Popular Actress
2012: Most Popular Actress
2014: Best Actress & Most Popular Actress (Top 5)

Bella Awards
2013: Bella On-screen Award

Filmography

Television dramas

Film

References

External links
Official Facebook page of Debbie Goh

Malaysian actresses
Malaysian people of Chinese descent
Malaysian women television presenters
Living people
1978 births
Hong Kong television presenters
Hong Kong women television presenters
Malaysian beauty pageant winners
People from Johor Bahru